Henry François Farny (15 July 1847, Ribeauvillé – 23 December 1916) was an American painter and illustrator. His work was centered on the life of Native Americans in the 19th-century United States.

Biography
Farny's family left France in 1853 to emigrate to the United States. The family moved to Warren, Pennsylvania, near a Seneca reservation. As a child, he learned the lore of the woods from Seneca Indians, who came from their reservation
to hunt in the neighborhood where his father lived. In his boyhood, he was fond of covering the walls of his father's board-house with pictures of animals, birds, and Indians, which he scratched with nails or framed by aid of burnt sticks.

Around 1859, the Farny family moved to Cincinnati, Ohio. Attracted by painting and drawing, the young man became an illustrator for magazines and books for children. When he was 18 years old, Harper's Weekly published a double-page view of Cincinnati he made.

Between 1867 and 1870, he took private lessons from Albert Bierstadt in Düsseldorf. By the time Farny had arrived at Düsseldorf, and began attending Düsseldorf academy in the late 1860s ,the Düsseldorf school of painting had already begun to lose its once high acclaim among most of the American populace.

One part of America where this was not the case was in Cincinnati, where the realist objectives taught there were still being held in high esteem. Despite this, upon his return to Cincinnati in 1870, Farny, who had been studying abroad, came home to a minimally responsive demand by Cincinnatians for his paintings. He used his newfound skills in the service of poster painting and other odd jobs. In 1873, this all changed when he was commissioned by the chamber of commerce to depict in drawing the different stages of pork packing in Cincinnati.

In 1881, inspired by the developing market for Indian paintings, Farny traveled up the Missouri River, making sketches, taking notes and photography, and collecting artifacts. On several more trips West, he did the same, until his Cincinnati studio contained enough material for almost any Indian subject he wished to illustrate. Upon his return to Cincinnati, he remarked: "The plains, the buttes, the whole country and its people are fuller of material for the artist than any country in Europe."

About 100 paintings were inspired by Farny's western trips in the 1880s. Ration Day at Standing Rock Agency, The Song of the Talking Wire, and The Last Vigil are among his most famous. His understanding of the Indian's plight is often apparent in his work.

Farny was one of the founding members of the Cincinnati Art Club and served as its second president from 1892–94.

Theodore Roosevelt once said to Farny: "Farny, the nation owes you a great debt. It does not realize it now, but it will some day. You are preserving for future generations phases of American history that are rapidly passing away."

He died in Cincinnati in 1916.  His obituary appeared in the Cincinnati Enquirer on December 25, 1916.

Legacy
Farny's art continues to gain in popularity, and most serious public as well as private Western art collections include at least one painting. Recently, his Southern Plains Indian Warrior sold at Bonhams for £224,097 (US$362,500) - more than three times its original estimated value.

Artworks

Selected artworks

References

Further reading
 Henry Farny, Inventories of American Painting (IAP), Smithsonian Institution Research Information System (SIRIS)
 Baltzer, Charles. Henry F. Farny. Cincinnati: Indian Hill Historical Museum Association, 1978.
 Carter, Denny. Henry Farny. New York: Watson-Guptill Publications, 1978

External links

Henry F. Farny - Smithsonian American Art Museum
PBS Antiques Roadshow Best Moment -- A painting of Farny's is evaluated and appraised. From the program's official YouTube channel.

19th-century American painters
American male painters
American illustrators
20th-century American painters
1847 births
1916 deaths
French emigrants to the United States
Artists from Cincinnati
Painters from Ohio
People from Ribeauvillé
19th-century American male artists
20th-century American male artists